HD 44219 is a solar-type star with an exoplanetary companion in the equatorial constellation of Monoceros. It has an apparent visual magnitude of 7.69, making it an 8th magnitude star that is too faint to be readily visible to the naked eye. The system is located at a distance of 173 light-years from the Sun based on parallax measurements, but is drifting closer with a radial velocity of −12 km/s.

This is an ordinary G-type main-sequence star with a stellar classification of G3V. L. Casagrande and associates in 2011 estimated the age of the star as 5.4 billion years, while A. Bonfanti and colleagues listed a much greater age of nearly 10 billion years in 2015. It has a near solar metallicity and is spinning with a projected rotational velocity of 1.5 km/s. The star has about the same mass as the Sun but is 37% larger in radius. It is radiating 1.83 times the luminosity of the Sun from its photosphere at an effective temperature of 5,749 K.

In 2009, a Jovian planet was found in a highly eccentric orbit around the star by the HARPS planet search program. There is some evidence of an additional, longer-period companion.

See also 
 List of extrasolar planets

References 

G-type main-sequence stars
Planetary systems with one confirmed planet

Monoceros (constellation)
Durchmusterung objects
044219
030114